Smosarski is a Polish masculine surname, its feminine counterpart is Smosarska. Notable people with the surname include:

Jadwiga Smosarska (1898–1971), Polish film actress

Polish-language surnames